Pru or PRU may refer to:

 Prudence (given name)
 Prunella (given name)
 Prudencesa Renfro, American  singer
 Prudential Tower or Pru, Boston, Massachusetts, US
 Prudential plc or The Pru, a UK financial company 
 Prudential Financial, stock symbol
 Pru (album), 2000
 Pru (band), Thai
 Pru District
 Pru (Ghana parliament constituency)
 Prudhoe railway station, station code
 No. 1 Photographic Reconnaissance Unit RAF, 1 PRU
 Pupil Referral Unit, UK, for children unable to attend school

See also
 Prue (disambiguation)